Willenscharen is a municipality in the district of Steinburg, in Schleswig-Holstein, Germany. The airfield of the model airplane community of Steinburg is located here.

References

External links
Modellfluggemeinschaft Kreis Steinburg

Steinburg